Licorice International is the largest specialty retailer of imported licorice in the United States.  The company distributes licorice from 14 countries through its internet site and retail store in Lincoln, Nebraska.  and provides a Licorice-of-the-Month Club. .

Products

Licorice International carries nearly 160 types of licorice. Its best sellers include:
 Haribo Black Licorice Wheels
 Leaf Candy Company Black Pipes
 Oatfield (confectionery) Creamy Licorice Toffee
 Katjes Kinder (Cats)
 Kookaburra Black Twists
 Kookaburra Strawberry Twists
 K & H/Gustafs Muntdrops (Coins)
 Haribo Pontefract Cakes
 Gimbal’s Sugar-free Licorice Chews

History

Founded in 1996 by New York resident Larry Ring, the business was purchased in 2002 by Elizabeth Erlandson and Ardith Stuertz of Lincoln, Nebraska.

In 2004, Licorice International founded National Licorice Day, celebrated on April 12. National Licorice Day is listed in Chase’s Calendar of Events and celebrates black licorice, its history, health benefits and world renown.

References

Notes

External links
 Licorice International website

Lincoln
1996 establishments in New York (state)
Food and drink companies established in 1996
2002 mergers and acquisitions